Katherine Emily Hewlett (born December 17, 1976) is a Canadian film, television and stage actress.

Career
Hewlett has worked in television, film and theatre. Her brother is actor David Hewlett, who portrayed Rodney McKay in Stargate Atlantis. Hewlett guest-starred as McKay's sister, Jeannie Miller, in four episodes on the series. She also co-starred with him, again as his sister, in the 2006 film A Dog's Breakfast.

Hewlett wrote and starred in the off-Broadway production of Humans Anonymous which was the winner of Best of Fringe and Best Ensemble at the 2008 Toronto Fringe Festival and Outstanding New Play at the 2010 New York International Fringe Festival.

In 2012, Hewlett was cast in the Canadian teen drama series Degrassi: The Next Generation as Margaret Matlin, a role she played until 2014. In 2013, she starred in Jeremy Lalonde's low-budget comedy feature film Sex After Kids.

In 2014, she was cast in the comedy television series The Stanley Dynamic as Lisa Stanley. In the episode 'The Stanley Astronaut' she once again worked alongside her brother, David. 

Hewlett guest starred in the 2016 Starz series The Girlfriend Experience, based on Steven Soderbergh's film of the same name. 

She played the role of Mayor Flaherty in the TV show Hollie Hobby in 2018.

In 2013 Hewlett published her book The Swearing Jar  which has been turned into a play. In 2021 it was announced that production had begun on a further feature film adaptation, which is slated to premiere in 2022 as The Swearing Jar.

Personal life 
Hewlett was born in Toronto, Ontario.

Filmography

Film

Television

References

External links 
 
 Review of The Swearing Jar in Backstage
 
 

1976 births
Living people
Actresses from Toronto
Canadian television actresses
Canadian people of English descent
Canadian women dramatists and playwrights
21st-century Canadian dramatists and playwrights
21st-century Canadian women writers
21st-century Canadian actresses
Canadian film actresses
Canadian stage actresses
Canadian Film Centre alumni